Serious Times is a 2010 album by the roots reggae artist, Horace Andy. The album features a band made up of veteran reggae musicians including drummer Leroy "Horsemouth" Wallace, keyboard player Lloyd "Obeah" Denton and saxophonist Dean Fraser. It was produced by German reggae producer Andreas "Brotherman" Christophersen.

Reception

Rick Anderson of Allmusic gave the album 3.5 out of 5 stars, noting 'rootsy-yet-modern reggae rhythms', but also saying that not every track on this album was a highlight, also commenting on how vibrato vocals are starting sound like a 'self-parody'.

Track listing
All lyrics by Horace Hinds; all music composed by Andreas "Brotherman" Christophersen

Personnel
Horace Andy - vocals
Andreas "Brotherman" Christophersen - guitar (tracks 2-6, 8-10, 12-15)
Andrew "Bassie" Campbell (tracks 6, 8), Daniel "Axeman" Thompson (tracks 1-5, 7, 9, 10-15) - bass guitar
Lloyd "Obeah" Denton - keyboards (tracks 1-15)
Leroy "Horsemouth" Wallace - drums (tracks 1-15)
Herman "Bongo" Herman (tracks 1, 10, 12), Christopher "Sky Juice" Blake (tracks 2-4, 15), Uziah "Sticky" Thompson (tracks: 6, 8) - percussion
Dean Fraser - saxophone (tracks 1, 6, 7, 11, 12, 14)
Romero Gray (track 6), Ronald "Nambo" Robinson (tracks 1, 2, 7, 11, 12, 14) - trombone
Chronic Horns - sampled horns (track 9)
Brady Shammar (track 8), Nina Karle (track 13), Pam Hall (tracks 1, 2, 5-7, 9, 12, 14) - backing vocals

References

2010 albums
Horace Andy albums
Studio One (record label) albums